Procharista spectabilosa is a moth in the family Lecithoceridae. It was described by Kyu-Tek Park in 2009. It is found in Thailand.

The wingspan is 12.5–13 mm. The forewings are yellowish brown. The hindwings are uniform clothed with brownish short hair-like scales on the surface, with well developed orange-white hair-pencils along the costa basally.

Etymology
The species name is derived from Latin spectabil (remarkable) and the Latin suffix osus.

References

Moths described in 2009
Procharista